Myennis octopunctata is a species of picture-winged fly in the genus Myennis of the family Ulidiidae.

Distribution
Most of Central and Northern Europe.

References

Ulidiidae
Insects described in 1798
Diptera of Europe
Taxa named by Jean Antoine Coquebert de Montbret